Galanthus elwesii, Elwes's snowdrop or greater snowdrop, is a species of flowering plant in the family Amaryllidaceae, native to the Caucasus.

It grows from a globose bulb, 2–3 cm in diameter. It produces two leaves which are obtuse, linear, and blue-green in colour. The flowers are globose, white, pendulous, 2–3 cm long, and solitary at the tip of a solid, pointed scape. The outer floral tepals are oblanceolate, with shorter inner tepals that are emarginate (notched at the apex), tapering towards their base with green patches apically and basally (see illustrations). The fruit forms a dehiscent capsule with three valves. Overall Galanthus elwesii is a more robust plant than G. nivalis.

Taxonomy
Galanthus elwesii was identified by the British botanist Henry John Elwes on a visit to Turkey in 1874. In early April, whilst in the mountains near Smyrna (modern Izmir), he came across "the fine large snowdrop which now bears my name". It was then formally described by Joseph Dalton Hooker (1875) and named Galanthus elwesii, with an illustration by W H Fitch in Curtis's Botanical Magazine. Thus the species bears his name as the botanical authority. Later the plants collected by Elwes were found to be Galanthus gracilis, but the name was retained for a different specimen.

Distribution
A native of the Caucasus in Europe, the species has been widely introduced elsewhere.

Cultivation
Galanthus elwesii is grown as an ornamental plant in gardens where it easily naturalises. Bulbs planted in the autumn flower in the early spring. Propagation is by separation of bulbils after flowering.

In the UK, the following have received the Royal Horticultural Society's Award of Garden Merit: 
Galanthus elwesii 
Galanthus elwesii 'Comet' 
Galanthus elwesii var. monostictus

References

Bibliography

 
 
  see Enciclopedia Argentina de Agricultura y Jardinería

External links

Amaryllidoideae
Taxa named by Joseph Dalton Hooker